Paul Willis (April 9, 1901 – November 3, 1960) was an American actor of the silent film era.

Biography
Born in Chicago, Illinois, Willis began his career as a child actor in the 1910s. He made his screen debut for Vitagraph Studios at the age of twelve in the title role of the 1913 drama-short Little Kaintuck. He would go on to play a variety of juvenile roles, often opposite child actress Mildred Harris. One notable film starring Willis was the 1914 Edward Dillon-directed comedy-short Bill Goes in Business for Himself which also starred actor and future successful film director Tod Browning. In 1917 Willis appeared opposite the popular onscreen duo Harold Lockwood and May Allison in the romantic drama The Promise.

Through the 1910s and into the 1920s, Paul Willis would appear opposite such actors as Carmel Myers, Lester Cuneo, Broncho Billy Anderson and Mae Marsh.

Willis is possibly best recalled for his portrayal of Dickon Sowerby in the 1919 Gustav von Seyffertitz-directed film adaptation of the Frances Hodgson Burnett novel The Secret Garden for the Famous Players-Lasky Corporation, in which he appeared opposite actors Lila Lee, Richard Rosson and Spottiswoode Aitken. The film is now considered lost.

Willis retired from acting at age 22. His final film appearance was in the 1923 Tom Forman-directed drama Money! Money! Money!, opposite Katherine MacDonald and Carl Stockdale.

Willis died at the age of 59 in Los Angeles, California in 1960.

Partial filmography

Little Kaintuck (1913, Short) - Little Kaintuck
The Brute (1914, Short) - Ted Barton - Black's Son
Johanna, the Barbarian (1914, Short) - George - Johanna's Son
The Poor Folks' Boy (1914, Short) - Benny Benson
The Milkfed Boy (1914, Short) - The Widow's Milkfed Boy
Bill Goes in Business for Himself (1914, Short) - Bill's Other Friend
The Little Matchmaker (1915, Short) - Paul
A Man for All That (1915, Short) - The Young Boy
The Little Soldier Man (1915, Short) - Paul
A Rightful Theft (1915, Short) - Paul Brown - the Widow's Son
The Old Batch (1915, Short) - Johnny - the Adopted Son
The Little Lumberjack (1915, Short) - Paul - the Little Lumberjack
The Indian Trapper's Vindication (1915, Short) - Arnold King - their Son
Could a Man Do More? (1915, Short) - Richard Sherwood
The Fall of a Nation (1916) - Billy
The Promise (1917) - Charlie Manton
The Haunted Pajamas (1917) - Francis Billings
The Trouble Buster (1917) - 'Blackie' Moyle
Shootin' Mad (1918)
The Secret Garden (1919) - Dickon Sowerby
The Son-of-a-Gun (1919) - Buddy Brown
The Cry of the Weak (1919) - Budd
Nobody's Kid (1921) - John Maxwell
Thunderclap (1921) - Tommy
Money! Money! Money! (1923) - Lennie Hobbs (final film role)

References

Bibliography
 John Holmstrom, The Moving Picture Boy: An International Encyclopaedia from 1895 to 1995, Norwich, Michael Russell, 1996, p. 19.

External links
 

American male film actors
American male silent film actors
American male child actors
1901 births
1960 deaths
20th-century American male actors
Male actors from Chicago